The Society for Business Ethics is a non-profit organization established in 1980 to promote the advancement and understanding of ethics in business. Its mission is to provide a forum in which moral, legal, empirical, and philosophical issues of business ethics may be openly discussed and analyzed. Members include scholars, students, and professionals from several countries with a common interest in research, teaching, or the application of ethical principles to business management. The society sponsors a scholarly journal, Business Ethics Quarterly, publishes a newsletter, and hosts an annual conference. Individual members receive access to the journal, the right to vote for candidates for the Board of Directors, and a discount on registration for the annual conference.

Objectives 
The Society for Business Ethics exists to keep thinking and discussion surrounding business ethics alive and well. To that end, the Society strives to:
 Promote the study of business ethics
 Provide a forum in which moral, legal, empirical, and philosophical issues of business ethics may be openly discussed and analyzed
 Provide a means by which those interested in and concerned with business ethics may exchange ideas
 Promote research and scholarship through the regular publication of the journal Business Ethics Quarterly
 Promote the improvement of the teaching of business ethics in universities and organizations
 Foster a better understanding between college and university administrators and those engaged in teaching and research in the field of business ethics
 Help develop ethical business organizations
 Develop and maintain a friendly and cooperative relationship among teachers, researchers, and practitioners in the field of business and organizational ethics

Presidents and Board of Directors 
The following persons have been president of the society:

Board of Directors 
Each year members of the Society for Business Ethics elect a new member to the Board of Directors. The Board is the governing body of our Society and is responsible for all major policy decisions affecting the Society. Members of the Board of Directors serve a five year term. During the first year on the Board an individual serves as the Board member-at-large, during second year as secretary, during the third year as program chair (for our annual conference), during the fourth year as our Society’s president, and during the fifth year as Immediate Past President.

Publications 
The society publishes:
 Business Ethics Quarterly, 1991–present
 The Ruffin Series of the Society for Business Ethics
 Society For Business Ethics Newsletter, 1989–present
 Spiritual Goods: Faith Traditions and the Practice of Business, 2001

Annual meetings
Meetings of the Society are held in late July or early August, generally in conjunction with the meetings of the Academy of Management.  Information about the upcoming annual conference appears on the Society’s website.

References

External links

 A History of the Society for Business Ethics (2005)
 The Ruffin Series of the Society for Business Ethics

Business ethics organizations
Philosophical societies in the United States
Organizations established in 1980